The Brazilian diaspora is the migration of Brazilians to other countries, a mostly recent phenomenon that has been driven mainly by economic recession and hyperinflation that afflicted Brazil in the 1980s and early 1990s, and since 2014, by the political and economic crisis that culminated in the impeachment of Dilma Rousseff in 2016 and the election of Jair Bolsonaro in 2018, in addition to chronic violence in Brazilian urban centers.

Demographics 

There are an estimated 4,2 million Brazilians living abroad, mainly in the U.S. (1,775,000), Paraguay (240,000), Portugal (276,000), United Kingdom (220,000), Japan (207,081), Spain (156,000) and Germany (144,000).

United States 

There were an estimated 246,000 Brazilian Americans as of 2007. Another source gives an estimate of some 800,000 Brazilians living in the U.S. in 2000, while still another estimates that  some 1,100,000 Brazilians live in the United States, 300,000 of them in Florida.
Major concentrations are in Massachusetts, New York, New Jersey, Connecticut, Pennsylvania, Georgia, Florida, Wisconsin, and California.

West 46th Street has historically been a commercial center for Brazilians living or visiting New York City. In 1995 the city officially recognized it as "Little Brazil Street".

In Massachusetts, there is a very small but significant concentration of Brazilian immigrants in the town of Framingham, which in recent years has spilt out into the neighboring towns of Marlborough and Hudson, among others.
In the Brazilian community, it is said that Pompano Beach in Florida has the greatest concentration of Brazilians in the USA. The Brazilian communities in these towns are vibrant, having contributed much to the local cuisine and culture, but Brazilian immigrants often feel discriminated against and are often thought to be illegal immigrants by their non-Brazilian neighbors.

A disproportionate number of Brazilians who have emigrated to the US came from the town of Governador Valadares, in the state of Minas Gerais.

United Kingdom 

There are no precise figures for the number of Brazilians living in the UK. The 1991 Census recorded 9,301 Brazilian-born people in the UK, and the 2001 Census recorded 15,215. In 2004, the Brazilian Consulate in London recorded 13,000 Brazilians who had voluntarily registered themselves with them, but said this was not an accurate figure for the number living in the UK; the Brazilian Embassy estimated that figure to be about 80,000. The Office for National Statistics estimates suggest that there were 56,000 Brazilian-born people resident in the UK in 2008. In 2015, the Brazilian Consulate estimated a total of 120,000 Brazilians resident in the UK. The ONS estimated that in 2018, 87,000 people born in Brazil were living in the UK.

Japan 

The majority of Brazilians living in Japan are of Japanese descent, and they Immigration Act was altered to allow children and grandchildren of Japanese nationals, as well as their non-Japanese spouse,  to receive a work permit easily.  Most of them live in industrial areas where there used to be a plenty of job offers at factories, such as Aichi, Shizuoka and Gunma Prefectures, among others.  While approximately 300,000 Brazilians lived there at its climax, the economic crisis in 2008 slashed their job and more than a third of them have decided to return to Brazil.

Canada 

There are an estimated 22,920 Brazilians living in Canada. Major concentrations are in Toronto, Montreal, Vancouver, and Calgary.

Germany

France

Portugal 

Portugal is another important destination for Brazilians, owing to a common language and given the fact that a significant number of Brazilians already hold Portuguese citizenship (particularly after Portugal modified its nationality law to be able to bestow it upon any grandchild of a verified Portuguese citizen). Cultural similarities are abundant and the Portuguese are fairly acquainted with Brazilian pop culture. Approximately a fourth of all foreigners currently residing in Portugal are Brazilian citizens.

Paraguay 

Brazilians and their descendants living in Paraguay are called Brasiguayos. This numerous community of landowners is mainly involved in agriculture.

Mexico

Australia

Angola

Organizations 
Brazilian Immigrant Center Boston
Brazilian Community in Massachusetts in English
Brazilian Community in California in English
Brazilian Community in New Jersey in English and Portuguese
Brazilian Community in New York in English
BCA-Brazilian Community Association in British Columbia Vancouver
Estimates of Brazilians living abroad by region in Portuguese

Statistics

References

External links 
 Brazilian Times (Brazilian newspaper in the U.S.)
 The Brasilians (Brazilian newspaper in New York)
 "Japan's fear of Brazilians", BBC News
 Brazilians in London, BBC London
 Brazilian Educational and Cultural Centre (BrEACC)

 
Cultural history of Brazil